Donadi is a village in Kahara tehsil of Doda district in the Indian union territory of Jammu and Kashmir. It is famous for a hydroelectric power project called Lower Kalnie Power Project Donadi.

Etymology
Donadi name is derived from Gojri language; Do means Two and Nadi means stream or rivulets. The two rivulets unite near Donadi which later forms a rivulet known as Kalnai.

Location
Donadi is located on Thathri-Gandoh highway  from National Highway 244 near Thathri town.

References

Villages in Doda district
Chenab Valley